Ahmed Magdy (born 24 May 1986) is an Egyptian retired professional football defender and current youth coach working for Smouha SC. He played a variety of roles in the squad, including defensive midfield or center-back as well as in the left-back position.

Club career
Magdy is a graduate of the Al Ahly youth academy. He joined the Superleague Greece club Panionios on a free transfer before the 2005–06 season. In January 2007, he joined Atromitos in a player exchange, with ex-Atromitos player Rafik Djebbour going to Panionios.

In August 2007, Magdy transferred to Zamalek for 450,000 Euros from Atromitos.

In June 2010, Al-Masry won the services of both Magdy and Ahmed El Merghany in an exchange deal with Zamalek, who signed Mohamed Ashour El-Adham in return.

Coaching career
Retiring at the end of the 2017-18 season, Magdy was hired by his former club, Zamalek SC, as a youth coach. Previously, Magdy revealed on his Twitter profile, that he had acquired the FA Coaching Diploma. In the summer 2019, he was hired by Smouha SC, also as a youth coach.

Honors

Zamalek
Egypt Cup (2008)

Individuals
Superleague Greece Top 10 Talents (2006)

References

External links
 Guardian's Stats Centre
 Profile at FilGoal
 

1986 births
Living people
Egyptian footballers
People from Zagazig
Panionios F.C. players
Atromitos F.C. players
Zamalek SC players
Al Masry SC players
Wadi Degla SC players
Pyramids FC players
Egyptian Premier League players
Association football defenders
Association football midfielders